The Cyclopedidae is a family of anteaters that includes the silky anteater and its extinct relative, Palaeomyrmidon.

References 

Mammal families
Taxa named by R. I. Pocock
Extant Pliocene first appearances
Pilosans